It's Not What You Know is a BBC Radio 4 comedy panel show created and originally hosted by Miles Jupp, beginning on 23 February 2012. Series four onwards are hosted by Joe Lycett. The show features three celebrity contestants who have to answer questions based on the knowledge of people that they know personally, such as friends or relatives. Points are scored for how accurately the contestant predicts their counterpart.

History
It was developed from a round created by Jupp in the first series of the gameshow It's Your Round.  In that case the game was called What Does My Dad Know?, in which panellists had to guess what answers Miles Jupp's dad gave to various trivia questions.

Rounds
 It's What They Know - The nominees are asked about their respective panellists; the panellists need to second-guess what their nominees answered.
 It's Now What You Know - The panellists are asked about their respective nominees to find out how well they know them.
 Which Nominee? - The panellists are given an answer and need to identify which of the nominees gave it.
 The Big One/One Massive Question - The panellists need to predict the answer given by their nominee to a suitably 'big' but mundane question (e.g., how do they take their tea, what is their favourite item of cutlery).

Episodes

Winners are highlighted in bold.

Series 1

Series 2

Series 3

Series 4

Series 5

References

External links

2012 radio programme debuts
BBC Radio 4 programmes
BBC Radio comedy programmes
British panel games
British radio game shows
2010s British game shows
Radio game shows with incorrect disambiguation